"Till You Were Gone" is a song co-written and recorded by American country music artist Mike Reid. It was released in March 1991 as the second single from his album Turning for Home. It peaked at #17 on the U.S. Billboard Hot Country Singles & Tracks chart and at #8 on the Canadian RPM Country Tracks chart. This song followed Reid's number-one debut single, "Walk on Faith."  Reid wrote the song with Rory Bourke.

The song was originally recorded by Shelby Lynne on her 1989 album Sunrise.

Chart performance

Year-end charts

References

1991 singles
1989 songs
Mike Reid (singer) songs
Songs written by Mike Reid (singer)
Songs written by Rory Bourke
Song recordings produced by Steve Buckingham (record producer)
Columbia Records singles
Shelby Lynne songs